Eastwood and Langley Mill railway station is a former railway station serving the town of Eastwood and the village of Langley Mill in Derbyshire, England. It was opened by the Great Northern Railway on its Derbyshire Extension in 1875–6.

It lay on the branch from Awsworth Junction, where it crossed the Giltbrook Viaduct, on the way to Pinxton. At the time it was in Nottinghamshire, but since recent boundary changes it would now be in on the border of Nottinghamshire and Derbyshire. It closed in 1963 and was demolished by 1976, and the trackbed was used for the Eastwood Bypass.

Langley Mill and Eastwood was nearby on the Midland Railway Erewash Valley Line.

References

Former Great Northern Railway stations
Railway stations in Great Britain opened in 1876
Railway stations in Great Britain closed in 1963
Disused railway stations in Derbyshire